The Tipperary Militia was a regiment of militia raised in County Tipperary. Formed in 1793 it was converted in 1854 to an Artillery Militia unit, which was eventually disbanded in 1909.

History
The unit was first raised in 1793 as an infantry unit by John Bagwell (1751–1816), who was the member of parliament for Tipperary. In 1812 the unit was designated the Tipperary (or Duke of Clarence's Munster) Regiment of Militia.

In December 1854 the Militia was reorganised with the unit being converted into an Artillery unit. The Corps of Artillery was designated The South Tipperary Artillery Regiment of Militia.

The unit was embodied during the Crimean War (1855-6), the Indian Mutiny (1858-1861) and during the South African War (1900) but never served overseas. The unit was redesignated as the 5th Brigade, South Irish Division, RA, in 1882, Tipperary Artillery (Southern Division), RA, in 1889, and  Tipperary Royal Garrison Artillery (Militia) in 1902. It was transferred to the Special Reserve Royal Field Artillery in 1908 on the formation of the Territorial Force and disbanded the following year.

References

Bibliography

 Litchfield, Norman E H, 1987.  The Militia Artillery 1852-1909, The Sherwood Press, Nottingham. 
 Ryan, C A, Maj, 1890. Records of the Tipperary Artillery 1793-1889

Irish Militia regiments
History of the British Army
Tipperary
Military units and formations disestablished in 1909
History of County Tipperary